Kaʻauwai or Kaauwai may refer to:

Zorobabela Kaʻauwai (/1806–1856), a Supreme Court judge and politician of the Kingdom of Hawaii.
David Kahalekula Kaʻauwai (died 1856), politician and legislator of the Kingdom of Hawaii.
William Hoapili Kaʻauwai (1882–1958), politician and legislator of the Kingdom of Hawaii.
Mary Ann Kiliwehi Kaʻauwai (1840–1873), a Hawaiian high chiefess and lady-in-waiting to Queen Emma.

Elizabeth Kahanu Kaʻauwai (1970–1932), Hawaiian princess